Sparganothis karacana is a species of moth of the family Tortricidae. It is found in the United States, including Alabama, Arkansas, Florida, Indiana, Massachusetts, Mississippi, New Jersey, New York and Ohio.

The wingspan is 17–20 mm.

References

Moths described in 1907
Sparganothis